Nassim Saidi (born 9 December 1994) is an Algerian cyclist, who currently rides for Emirati amateur team Dubai Police.

Major results

2015
 2nd  Team time trial, African Games
 3rd Time trial, National Road Championships
 3rd Critérium International de Blida
 9th Road race, African Under-23 Road Championships
2016
 1st Critérium International de Blida
 2nd  Team time trial, African Road Championships
 National Road Championships
2nd Road race
4th Time trial
 4th Critérium International d'Alger
 4th Circuit d'Alger
 8th Overall Tour du Faso
1st Stage 8
 8th Overall Tour d'Annaba
 10th Overall Tour Internationale d'Oranie
2019
 3rd  Road race, African Games
 5th Overall Tour d'Egypte
1st Points classification
1st Stage 2
 6th Overall Tour of Mevlana
 8th Trophée de l'Anniversaire, Challenge du Prince
2020
 9th Grand Prix Manavgat–Side
2021
 African Road Championships
2nd  Road race
3rd  Team time trial
 2nd Time trial, National Road Championships
 9th Grand Prix Velo Manavgat
2022
 1st  Road race, Arab Road Championships
 3rd Grand Prix Tomarza
 4th Road race, African Road Championships
2023
 African Road Championships
 1st  Team time trial
4th Road race
 8th Overall Tour of Sharjah
1st  Points classification

References

External links

1994 births
Living people
Algerian male cyclists
African Games silver medalists for Algeria
African Games medalists in cycling
Competitors at the 2015 African Games
African Games bronze medalists for Algeria
Competitors at the 2019 African Games
Sportspeople from Algiers
21st-century Algerian people
20th-century Algerian people
Mediterranean Games competitors for Algeria
Competitors at the 2022 Mediterranean Games